Liv Westphal (born December 22, 1993, in Milan, Italy) is a French long-distance runner. She is the current French record holder for the 10 km and the 5000m indoor and the Under-23 French record holder for the 3000m indoor, 5000m indoor, 5000m, and 10,000m.

Westphal was named twice NCAA Division I cross country All-American honoree by the USTFCCCA (2013 and 2014) and one time NCAA Division I outdoor track and field All-American honoree for the 5,000m (2015).

She earned a Bachelor's degree in Communications from Boston College in May 2015 and  a Master of Science in Leadership and Administration from Boston College in May 2016.

Biography  
Westphal is a two-time French Junior champion in the 3000 m. She placed  eleventh in the 5000m at the 2011 European Junior Championships, in Tallinn, Estonia.

She finished twelfth in the junior race at the 2012 European Cross-country Championships, in Budapest, Hungary, and eleventh in the 3000 m at the 2012 World Junior Championships in Barcelona, Spain.

She finished 6th in the Under-23 race at the 2013 European Cross-Country Championships in Belgrade, Serbia, and 5th in the 5000 m at the 2013 European Athletics Under-23 Championships in Tampere, Finland. In March 2017, Westphal's 5th place was upgraded to a bronze medal due to the disqualifications of Gamze Bulut and Tsehainesh Tsale.

On December 6, 2014, in Boston, she broke the French record for the 5000 m indoor in a time of 15 min 31 s 62. In February 2015, she ran 9 min 08 s 99 for 3000 m indoor and broke the Under-23 French record. Three months later, at the ACC Championship in Tallahassee, Florida, she ran 33 min 42 s 03 in the first 10,000 meters of her career and broke her third Under-23 French record of the 2015 season.

On July 12, 2015, she won the 5000 meters at the European Under-23 Championship in Tallinn, Estonia, and broke the Under-23 French record in 15 min 30 s 61. Two weeks later, she took part in the 5000m at the Salinsbury Games in London, Great Britain, and lowered, for the third time, the Under-23 French record to 15 min 28 s 61.

On October 12, 2015, she took part in her first 10k road race at the Tufts Health Plan 10k for Women and broke the Under-23 French 10k road race record in the time of 33 min 26 s.

On December 13, 2015, aged 21, she competed in the senior race at the European Cross Country Championship in Hyères, France. She finished 20th, while the French senior women team won the silver medal.

On October 23, 2016, she won the Mayor's Cup Cross Country meet in 16 min 53 s ahead of Amy Van Alstine and Mary Cain in historic Franklin Park, hosted by B.A.A. and USATF New England.

On December 11, 2016, she competed in the senior race at the European Cross Country Championship in Chia, Italy, and finished 9th.

On December 31, 2016, she took part in the San Silvestre Vallecana in Madrid, Spain, and ran the 10k road race in a time of 32 min 42 s.

In 2019, she competed in the senior women's race at the 2019 IAAF World Cross Country Championships held in Aarhus, Denmark. She finished in 22nd place.

On December 29, 2019, she broke the French record of the 10 km with a time of 31 min 15 s during the Corrida de Houilles.

Records

Achievements

Notes and references

External links  
 
 Profile on European Athletics
 Profile on All-Athletics
 Profile on FFA
 

French female long-distance runners
Boston College Eagles women's track and field athletes
1993 births
Living people
Boston College Eagles women's cross country runners
French Athletics Championships winners
French female cross country runners
Athletes (track and field) at the 2018 Mediterranean Games
Mediterranean Games competitors for France